Traffic Giant is a video game released in 2000 by Austrian developer JoWooD Productions. It allows players to create a working public transportation system in a city using buses, streetcars, commuter rail, suspended monorail (much like the Schwebebahn Wuppertal), and Maglev trains. The game used 2D isometric graphics for its interface.

Reception

The game received "mixed" reviews according to the review aggregation website Metacritic.

See also
 Cities in Motion 2
 Mobility
 Train Fever
 Transport Tycoon

References

External links

2000 video games
Business simulation games
JoWooD Entertainment games
Multiplayer and single-player video games
Transport simulation games
Video games with isometric graphics
Video games developed in Austria
Windows games
Windows-only games